Amir Hasan was a Chupanid prince of the Ilkhanate in the early 14th century. He was the first son of Chupan.

Hasan had been made viceroy of Khurasan and Mazandaran during his father's lifetime. When Coban fled to Herat and was subsequently executed, Hasan took refuge with Ozbek Khan of the Blue Horde. He served under the khan and died of wounds he received in battle. Hasan had three sons: Tales, the governor of Isfahan, Fars, and Kerman, who accompanied him to the Blue Horde and died there; Haji Beg; and Quc Hosayn, who was put to death in 1343 on the orders of the Ilkhan Suleiman Khan.

Chobanids

14th-century Iranian people